Saigon Children's Charity (saigonchildren) is a non-profit organization based in Ho Chi Minh City that provides direct support to disadvantaged children in order to ensure wider access to education in Vietnam. The organisation was established in 1992 and is registered with the UK Charity Commission. saigonchildren is also registered as a non-profit organization in Vietnam and US.

Philosophy 
The organisation's strategic aim is sustainable economic development through education, with a focus on inclusion, empowerment and safeguarding.

Development 
saigonchildren works across all of Vietnam.

Schoolbuilding 
Up to 2019 saigonchildren has built 200 kindergarten/primary schools through partnerships between donors and local representatives for Ministry of Education and Training.

Scholarships 
Up to 2019 41,000 children were supported with scholarships including fees, rice, text books, uniforms, social care and extra help (health support, reading glasses and bicycles) to enable them to focus on staying in education.

Thăng Long School 
The vocational school in Ho Chi Minh City offers free classes in English, IT, and hospitality as well as social skills development through art, dance and photography projects. Each year around 1000 children study here.

Special Needs Education Programme 
saigonchildren also has an extensive Special Needs Education Programme, including a national autism education framework, and also supplies resources and expertise to Vietnamese disability charities.

Finance 
Accounts are audited annually by KPMG and lodged with the UK Charity Commission.

Directors 
Saigon Children's Charity was founded by Paul Cleves in 1992. The current director is Damien Roberts.

See also 
 List of non-governmental organizations in Vietnam

References 

Organizations established in 1992
Children's charities based in the United Kingdom
Foreign charities operating in Vietnam